Pathein District is a district of Ayeyawady Division, Myanmar. It is located around and includes the urban area of the city of Pathein. Its population was 1,630,716 in 2014.

Townships

The district consists of the following townships:
Kangyidaunt Township
Ngapudaw Township
Pathein Township
Thabaung Township

The district contains four subtownships:
Hainggyikyun Subtownship in Ngapudaw Township
Ngayokaung Subtownship in Ngapudaw Township
Ngwesaung Subtownship in Pathein Township
Shwethaungyan Subtownship spanning Pathein Township and Thabaung Township

Towns
The district contains 12 towns:
Pathein
Kangyidaunt
Thabaung
Kyonpyaw
Yekyi
Ngathaingchaung
Kyaunggon
Ngapudaw
Ngwesaung
Chaungtha

It contains 48 wards, 519 village groups and 2963 villages.

References

Districts of Myanmar
Ayeyarwady Region